Linden Township is a township in Winnebago County, Iowa, in the USA.

History
Linden Township was founded in 1880.

The Mattison home was the site of Linden's first school, which began in 1873. Linden No. 2 provided instruction in 1887 and 1889. A photograph shows students at Linden No. 4 in 1919.

References

Townships in Winnebago County, Iowa
Townships in Iowa